I-485 may refer to:

 Interstate 485 - interstate highway (beltway) around Charlotte, North Carolina, USA
 Interstate 485 (Georgia) - proposed but never constructed highway in Georgia, USA
 Form I-485 ("Application to Register Permanent Residence or to Adjust Status") - a form required for becoming a permanent resident of the United States